Freddie Foreman (born 5 March 1932), better known as Brown Bread Fred, is an English publican, gangster, former associate of the Kray twins and convicted criminal.

Foreman was a prominent figure in London gangland from the 1950s through to the 1980s.

Early life 
Frederick Gerald Foreman was born at 22 Sheepcote Lane, Battersea on 5 March 1932, the son of Herbert Albert Foreman.

Criminal history
Foreman was nicknamed "Brown Bread Fred" (‘Brown Bread’ being Cockney rhyming slang for ‘Dead’), as he was known in the underworld for being able to dispose of bodies.
 
For a large part of the 1960s, Foreman and the Kray twins' gang The Firm, ruled the streets in the East End of London. But Foreman’s association with them ended when all three were imprisoned. At the time of the arrests, Foreman was 36 years old and licensee of The Prince of Wales on Lant Street in Southwark.
 
Foreman was involved in the disposal of the body of Jack "the Hat" McVitie (murdered by Reggie Kray). He was sentenced to ten years in prison.
 
Foreman was later sentenced to nine years imprisonment for handling proceeds from the Security Express robbery in Shoreditch, East London in 1983, which at the time was the largest cash robbery in the UK along with Ronnie Knight and Cliford Saxe.
 
In his autobiography, Respect, Foreman also admitted to the murders of Frank "Mad Axeman" Mitchell and Tommy "Ginger" Marks during the 1960s in revenge for the shooting of his brother who had been shot in the groin. He had been acquitted of these murders at an Old Bailey trial in the 1960s.

Foreman has served a total of 16 years in prison.

Television

Fred (2018) 
In 2018, it was announced that a biopic documentary would be made on Foreman, directed by his son Jamie. Rather than glamorizing Foreman’s life of crime, Fred is billed as a sombre and intimate look at the notorious villain towards the end of his life. The biopic was written and directed by Paul Van Carter.

Fred was released in the UK on 17 March 2018.

Personal life
Foreman is married to Maureen Foreman. Together they have three children, actor Jamie Foreman, Gregory and Danielle. Foreman has 3 grandchildren.

In 2018, it was reported Foreman was living in a nursing home with no money, estranged from his family.

Published works 
Foreman has authored 10 books.

 Respect (1997)
 The God Father of British Crime (2005)
 Brown Bread Fred (2007)
 Getting it Straight (2011)
 The Last Real Gangster (2015)
 Freddie Foreman Pictures (2015)
 The Krays "Read all About It" (2016)
 Freddie Foreman in Pictures (2017)
 Running with The Krays (2017)
 The Godfather of British Crime (2018)

References

Literature 

1932 births
Living people
English gangsters
20th-century English criminals
British people convicted of robbery
Criminals from London